Lola Chantrelle Mitchell (August 7, 1979 – January 1, 2023), better known by her stage name Gangsta Boo, was an American rapper. She rose to prominence as a member of Three 6 Mafia, which she joined at the age of 14.  After releasing six albums, she left the group and its record label after the release of her second solo album, Both Worlds *69 (2001), due to financial disputes and issues regarding promotion of the album. She subsequently released several solo albums and became known for collaborating with artists such as Eminem, Run the Jewels, La Chat, Latto, GloRilla, and Yelawolf.

Early life
Lola Chantrelle Mitchell was born in the Whitehaven area of Memphis, Tennessee, on August 7, 1979. Though she was from a middle-class family, she said that they later "moved to the hood" after her parents divorced. She started rapping at around the age of 14.

Music career

Three 6 Mafia
After being discovered by DJ Paul of Three 6 Mafia, Gangsta Boo was featured on the group's 1995 debut album Mystic Stylez and continued to collaborate with the group for five more albums. She ultimately left the group in 2001 to prioritize her solo career.

In 2013, she joined the Three 6 Mafia spin-off group Da Mafia 6ix, and was significantly featured on their debut mixtape 6ix Commandments. She departed from the group in 2014.

Solo work
Gangsta Boo's first solo album, Enquiring Minds, was released in 1998 and reached number 15 on the Billboard Top R&B/Hip-Hop Albums chart and number 46 on the Billboard 200. The album featured the surprise hit "Where Dem Dollas At!?".

Her second album, Both Worlds *69 (2001), reached number 8 on the R&B/Hip-Hop chart and number 29 on the Billboard 200. In 2003, she released her third album, Enquiring Minds II: The Soap Opera. The album peaked at number 53 on the R&B/Hip-Hop chart and 24 on the Independent Albums chart.<ref>Minds II: Soap Opera (Top R&B/Hip-Hop Albums chart), Billboard, November 22, 2003.</ref>

In 2009, Gangsta Boo released her third mixtape The Rumors (following her previous mixtapes Street Ringers Vol. 1 and Still Gangsta). She also released two mixtapes with DJ Fletch, Miss.Com (No DJ Version on iTunes) and 4 Da Hood. On June 27, 2011, she released her mixtape with Trap-A-Holics, Forever Gangsta. That same year, she collaborated with Yelawolf and Eminem on the song "Throw It Up".

On May 27, 2014, the extended play Witch, a collaboration with La Chat, was released. On October 14, 2014, Gangsta Boo teamed up with BeatKing and released a collaborative mixtape, Underground Cassette Tape Music, Vol. 1. In 2018, a successor mixtape titled Underground Cassette Tape Music, Vol. 2, was released.

Gangsta Boo was featured on the Run the Jewels track "Love Again (Akinyele Back)" from their 2014 album Run the Jewels 2, and reappeared on the track "Walking in the Snow" from their 2020 album RTJ4. In 2022, she was featured alongside GloRilla on the song "FTCU" by rapper Latto. At the time of her death, she had been working on an album that was planned to be titled The BooPrint.

 Death 
Mitchell was found dead on the front porch of her home in Memphis, Tennessee, on January 1, 2023, at the age of 43. A cause of death was not immediately revealed, but an overdose is suspected.
 The police stated that there was no evidence of foul play.

Discography

Solo albums
 Enquiring Minds (1998)
 Both Worlds *69 (2001)
 Enquiring Minds II: The Soap Opera (2003)

With Three 6 Mafia
 Mystic Stylez (1995)
 Chapter. 1 The End (1996)
 Chapter 2: World Domination (1997)
 Tear Da Club Up Thugs (1999)
 When the Smoke Clears: Sixty 6, Sixty 1 (2000)
 Choices: The Album (2001)

With Prophet Posse
 Body Parts (1998)

With Hypnotize Camp Posse
 Hypnotize Camp Posse (2000)

With La Chat
 Witch (2014)

Mixtapes

 Still Gangsta (with DJ Smallz) (2006)
 Memphis Queen Is Back (Still Gangsta Slowed & Throwed) (2007)
 The Rumors (with DJ Drama) (2009)
 Miss.Com (with DJ Fletch) (2010)
 4 Da Hood (with DJ Fletch) (2011)
 Foreva Gangsta (with Trap-A-Holics) (2011)
 It's Game Involved (2013)
 Underground Cassette Tape Music (with Beatking) (2014)
 Candy, Diamonds & Pill's (2015)
 Underground Cassette Tape Music 2'' (with Beatking) (2018)

Guest appearances

 Y'all Ain't No Killaz (with Gangsta Blac, Lord Infamous) (1996)
 A Couple of Jackers (with Gangsta Blac) (1996)
 "How U Like It" (with MAG) (1998)
 "We Starvin" (with E-40, Krayzie Bone) (1999)
 "Move Bitch" (with Lil Jon, YoungbloodZ, Three 6 Mafia, Chyna White, Don Yute) (1999)
 "I'll Call Before I Come" (with OutKast feat Eco) (2000)
 "BWA" (with Foxy Brown, Mia X) (1998)
 "Tennessee Titans" (with Tela, Yo Gotti, Haystack, Criminal Manne, Maru) (2004)
 "Da Blow" (with Lil Jon & The East Side Boyz) (2005)
 "Don't You Got A Wife" (with T.I.) (2005)
 "Trap Gurl" (with Gucci Mane) (2006)
 "EBT Hoe" (with Indo G, La Chat) (2007)
 "Stick Em Up" (with Gucci Mane) (2007)
 "Hollywood Stars" (with Lord T & Eloise) (2008)
 "I Love U No More" (with DJ King SamS feat Bobby Valentino and Norega) (2008)
 "We Gone Fight" (with United Soldiers Affiliation, Hardiss & Contra One) (2008)
 "Imma Kash Getta" (with Infamous-C feat Tha Realest) (2009)
 "Gangsta (Remix)" (with Infamous-C feat The Game, Assassin, and Bless) (2009)
 "Call The Weedman" (with Gucci Mane) (2009)
 "Aye Yo" (with Drumma Boy, GK, Allie, B-Hav, Degree and Kris) (2009)
 "Game Plan" (with Lord Infamous, T-Rock and II Tone) (2010)
 "Glass Slippers" (with Smallz One) (2011)
 "Throw It Up" (with Yelawolf feat Eminem) (2011)
 "Behave" (Drumma Boy feat B-Hav & Gangsta Boo) from: The Birth Of D-Boy Fresh (2011)
 "Naturellement Suspect" (with Gizo Evoracci and Kayse) (French Rappers) (2012)
 "Let's Fuck" (with E-40) (2012)
 "From Da City" (DJ LL feat Drumma Boy, Kristyle, B-Hav, Lionheart, GK, Degree, Allie Baby & Gangsta Boo) from: Welcome To My City 2 (2012)
 "M.E.M.P.H.I.S." (Frayser Boy feat Gangsta Boo & La Chat) from: Welcome To My City 2 (2012)
 "Rollin'" (Drumma Boy feat B-Hav & Gangsta Boo) from: Welcome To My City 2 (2012)
 "Drum Gang" (Drumma Boy feat B-Hav, Degree, GK, Kristyle, Allie Baby & Gangsta Boo) from: Welcome To My City 2 (2012)
 "Move Back (Lil Jon)" (Jarren Benton feat Gangsta Boo) from: Freebasing With Kevin Bacon (2012)
 "Yea Hoe" (Sinjin Hawke feat Gangsta Boo) (2013)
 "UndergroundLegends" (Bones feat Gangsta Boo) from: "Cracker" (2013)
 "Bout To Be A Fight" (Lil Wyte and Frayser Boy feat Gangsta Boo) from: B.A.R. (Bay Area Representatives) (2014)
 "Tonight" (Clipping. feat Gangsta Boo) from: "CLPPNG"  (2014)
 "Love Again (Akinyele Back)" (Run the Jewels feat Gangsta Boo) from: Run the Jewels 2 (2014)
 "Run Up On Me (Nine Callisto feat Gangsta Boo) from: Antisocial  (2014)
 "12345666" (Butter Bullets feat Gangsta Boo) from: Memento Mori  (2015)
 "Buck" (Brillz & LAXX feat Gangsta Boo) from: Geekin EP  (2015)
 "Restless 90’S" (EDIDON feat. Mitchy Slick) from: The Hope Dealer, Pt. 1 (2015)
 "Moving Slow" (with Kholebeatz, La Chat, Joddski, Klish) (2017)
 "Long Way Home" (Junglepussy feat. Gangsta Boo) from: Jp3  (2018)
 "Gold Teeth" (Blood Orange feat. Project Pat, Gangsta Boo & Tinashe) from: Angel's Pulse  (2019)
 "Stamina (feat Gangsta Boo)" (Junglepussy) from: JP4 (2020)
 "Walking in the Snow" (Run the Jewels) from: Run the Jewels 4 (2020)
 "Calcified Glass" (Sightless Pit feat. YoshimiO & Gangsta Boo) from: "Lockstep Bloodwar"  (2023)

References

External links

 Rolling Stone profile
 Ultimate Band List profile
 Artist News: Straight from MTV.COM: Breaking News on Gangsta 'Lady Boo'
 
 Gangsta Boo Official Website

1979 births
2023 deaths
African-American women rappers
Prophet Entertainment
Rappers from Memphis, Tennessee
Three 6 Mafia members
21st-century American rappers
21st-century American women musicians
Gangsta rappers
21st-century women rappers